Astor Hotel may refer to:
 the Astor Hotel, Tianjin, China, Opened in 1863
 the John Jacob Astor Hotel, Astoria, Oregon, United States, built 1923 and listed on the U.S. National Register of Historic Places
 the Astor House Hotel, Golden, Colorado, built 1867
 the Astor House Hotel, New York City, built in 1836 and razed 1926
 the Astor House Hotel, Shanghai, established 1846
 the Astor on the Lake, Milwaukee, Wisconsin, built 1920
 the Astoria Hotel, built 1897 on Fifth Avenue in New York City, joined to its neighbor to create the original Waldorf-Astoria Hotel, razed 1928
 the Astoria Hotel, Satu Mare, Romania, built 1886
 the Hotel Astor, Times Square, New York City, built 1904 and razed 1967
 the Hotel Astor, Miami Beach, Florida, built 1936
 the Hotel Astoria (Saint Petersburg), Russia, built 1912
 the Hotel Astoria, Belgrade, built 1937
 the Hotel Astoria, Brussels, Belgium, built 1910